No. 73082 Camelot is a preserved British Railways Standard Class 5 4-6-0 based on the Bluebell Railway in Sussex, England, and owned by the 73082 Camelot Locomotive Society. It was outshopped from Derby Works in 1955, and worked on the Southern Region of British Railways. In August 1959, it received the name Camelot from withdrawn Urie King Arthur Class engine no. 30742.

Withdrawal
In 1966, the locomotive was sent to Woodham Brothers for scrapping. It languished at Barry Docks until 1979 when purchased by the 73082 Camelot Locomotive Society, and moved to the Bluebell Railway for restoration alongside Battle of Britain Pacific 34059 Sir Archibald Sinclair.

Restoration and operation on the Bluebell Railway
73082 returned to steam in 1995 after a protracted overhaul at Sheffield Park and put in almost ten years of service on the Bluebell Railway until withdrawal for a ten year overhaul in June 2005.

Camelot returned to service on the Bluebell Railway for the second time on 25 October 2015.
On 18 September 2018, Camelot made its first visit away from the Bluebell Railway, being hauled to the West Somerset Railway for their Autumn Steam Gala, being hauled over the mainline by Class 37 diesel 37 668, returning on the 1 October in the same way.

References

Further reading

External links

 73082 Camelot Locomotive Society
 Bluebell Railway webpage for Camelot

73082
5 73083
Steam locomotives based at the Bluebell Railway
Railway locomotives introduced in 1955
Standard gauge steam locomotives of Great Britain